Homoeodera is a genus of beetles belonging to the Anthribidae family.

List of species 
 Homoeodera alutaceicollis
 Homoeodera asteris
 Homoeodera compositarum
 Homoeodera coriacea
 Homoeodera edithia
 Homoeodera elateroides
 Homoeodera globulosa
 Homoeodera major
 Homoeodera nodulipennis
 Homoeodera paivae
 Homoeodera pumilio
 Homoeodera pygmaea
 Homoeodera rotundipennis
 Homoeodera scolytoides

References

External links
Global species

Anthribidae
Weevil genera